The 2020–21 Basketball Bundesliga, known as the easyCredit BBL for sponsorship reasons, was the 54th season of the Basketball Bundesliga (BBL), the top-tier level of professional club basketball in Germany. It ran from 6 November 2020 to 13 June 2021.

Alba Berlin won their second straight and tenth overall title, after defeating Bayern Munich in four games.

Teams

Team changes

Second-placed Eisbären Bremerhaven gave up its right to promotion.

Arenas and locations

Coaching changes

Regular season

League table

Results

Playoffs

All three rounds of the playoffs are played in a best-of-five format, with the higher seeded team playing the first, third and fifth game at home.

Awards and statistics

Major award winners
The awards were announced on 19 May 2021.

Statistical leaders

See also
2020 BBL-Pokal

Notes

References

External links
Official website 

Basketball Bundesliga seasons
German
1